Rafael Arkadyevich Chimishkyan (23 March 1929 – 25 September 2022) was a weightlifter who competed for the Soviet Union and Olympic, World, European and Soviet Champion. Chimishkyan was awarded the Honoured Master of Sports of the USSR title in 1952. He was an honorary citizen of Tbilisi.

Biography
Chimishkyan was born in Tbilisi, Georgian SSR on 23 March 1929. He started weightlifting in 1946. In his first Soviet Championship in 1949, he won a gold medal at bantamweight (56 kg). In 1950, Chimishkyan won silver at the World Weightlifting Championships and gold at the European Weightlifting Championships and then switched to featherweight (60 kg). He first won a silver at the Soviet Championships that year in this new category. Chimishkyan became a two-time World Champion (1954 and 1955), six-time European Champion (1950, 1952, 1954–57) and five-time USSR Champion (1949, 1951, 1954, 1955, 1960).

Chimishkyan won an Olympic gold medal at the 1952 Summer Olympics in Helsinki. He is the second Soviet weightlifter to become an Olympic Champion. He was the last living Olympic Champion as well as even the last living medalist in Weightlifting from the 1952 Olympics. Chimishkyan set 10 world records during his career: three in the snatch, two in the clean and jerk and five in the total.

References

External links
 Rafael Chimishkyan at Lift Up
 
 databaseOlympics.com
 

1929 births
2022 deaths
Sportspeople from Tbilisi
Armenian male weightlifters
Soviet male weightlifters
Male weightlifters from Georgia (country)
Olympic weightlifters of the Soviet Union
Olympic gold medalists for the Soviet Union
Olympic medalists in weightlifting
Medalists at the 1952 Summer Olympics
Weightlifters at the 1952 Summer Olympics
Soviet Armenians
Georgian people of Armenian descent
Honoured Masters of Sport of the USSR
European Weightlifting Championships medalists
World Weightlifting Championships medalists
Ethnic Armenian sportspeople